Fodé Camara (born 9 December 1973) is a Guinea professional footballer who played as a forward. He represented the Guinea national team at international level.

Camara began his professional career in Belgium with Sint-Niklase. He played for several other Belgian clubs, including Waregem and Kortrijk. He scored a goal for Kortrijk as they achieved their biggest margin of victory over his-former club Waregem on 25 January 1998.

Camara made several appearances for the Guinea national football team, including appearances at the 1994 and 1998 African Cup of Nations finals. He played for Guinea at the 1989 FIFA U-17 World Championship.

In 2012 Camara returned to Indonesia for managed his former club Bontang FC.

References

External links

1973 births
Living people
Association football forwards
Guinean footballers
K.S.V. Waregem players
K.V. Kortrijk players
K.R.C. Zuid-West-Vlaanderen players
Chengdu Tiancheng F.C. players
Bontang F.C. players
Fello Star players
Guinea youth international footballers
Guinea international footballers
1994 African Cup of Nations players
1998 African Cup of Nations players
Expatriate footballers in China
Expatriate footballers in Indonesia
Expatriate football managers in Indonesia
Expatriate footballers in Thailand
Guinean football managers